The Kruger telegram was a message sent by Germany's Kaiser Wilhelm II to Stephanus Johannes Paulus Kruger, president of the Transvaal Republic, on 3 January 1896. The Kaiser congratulated the president on repelling the Jameson Raid, a sortie by 600 British irregulars from Cape Colony into the Transvaal under the command of Leander Starr Jameson.  The raid was intended to trigger an anti-government uprising by the primarily British expatriate miners, but was a fiasco with 65 of the raiders killed to only one Boer, and the rest surrendering. The telegram caused huge indignation in the UK, and led to a further inflammation of tensions between Britain and Germany.

The telegram

On receiving news of the Jameson Raid on 31 December 1895, the Kaiser reacted furiously, approving decisions to order a landing party of 50 marines to proceed to Pretoria to protect the Germans there and to dispatch a cruiser to Delagoa Bay.  At a meeting on 1 January 1896 his behaviour towards his own Minister of War was so violent that the latter had difficulty in restraining himself from "drawing swords" and doubted that the Kaiser was "entirely normal" mentally. On 2 January the Kaiser wrote to Tsar Nicholas II of Russia to pursue the idea of a continental league against Great Britain.

On 3 January the Kaiser met with leading military and government representatives and the Foreign Secretary Adolf Marschall von Bieberstein's idea of a telegram was agreed upon as a compromise on the Kaiser's more extreme proposals such as declaring the Transvaal a German protectorate and the dispatch of troops there. The wording of the telegram was toned down after the Chancellor threatened to resign and the final version read:

In his Memoirs, the Kaiser claimed that the Kruger telegram had been composed by Marschall. According to the Kaiser:

The Kaiser also asserted that there was a subsequent Russo-French proposal for war against England.

Reaction

The telegram was applauded by the conservative German press and criticised in the liberal papers due to the potential of conflict with Britain. It caused huge indignation in Great Britain and led to a further deterioration in relations between the two countries. The telegram was taken to mean that the Kaiser endorsed the Transvaal's independence in what was seen by the British as their sphere of influence, and the reference to "friendly powers" was interpreted by them as meaning that assistance would have been available from Germany if necessary and that such assistance might be available in the future.

The Times newspaper proclaimed that "England will concede nothing to menaces and will not lie down under insult." The windows of German shops were broken, and German sailors were attacked in London. The German diplomatic response was essentially conciliatory, with the Kaiser responding to a letter from Queen Victoria (his grandmother) with "Never was the Telegram intended as a step against England or your Government...."

Notes

Bibliography
 Massie, Robert K. - Dreadnought: Britain, Germany, and the Coming of the Great War. New York: Random House, (1991)
 Roberts, Andrew. Salisbury: Victorian Titan (2006) ch 37
 Sontag, Raymond J. "The Cowes Interview and the Kruger Telegram," Political Science Quarterly (1925) 40#2 pp. 217-247 in JSTOR
 van der Poel, J - The Jameson Raid, Oxford University Press, (1951)

Primary sources
 My Memoirs: 1878–1918 by William II, London: Cassell & Co. 1922.

1896 in the United Kingdom
1896 in Germany
Telegrams
Boer Republics
1896 in South Africa
Wilhelm II, German Emperor
1896 documents